Thanksgiving is an upcoming American slasher film directed by Eli Roth, based on his mock trailer of the same name from Grindhouse (2007). Roth and Jeff Rendell wrote the script, and is produced by them and Roger Birnbaum. It stars Addison Rae and Patrick Dempsey. The film will be released by TriStar Pictures.

Premise
"[The film] concerns a slasher who comes to a small Massachusetts town with the intention of 'creating a Thanksgiving carving board out of the town’s inhabitants'."

Cast
 Addison Rae
 Patrick Dempsey as the town's sheriff.
 Jalen Thomas Brooks
 Nell Verlaque
 Milo Manheim
 Gina Gershon
 Tim Dillon
 Rick Hoffman
 Gabriel Davenport
 Tomaso Sanelli
 Jenna Warren

Production

Development
After director Eli Roth created the fake movie trailer, Thanksgiving, for the film Grindhouse (2007), plans for a feature-length adaptation came underway. In 2010, Roth told CinemaBlend that he was writing the script with Jeff Rendell, and that he hoped to complete it once he was done with press for The Last Exorcism (2010). By August 2012, Jon Watts and Christopher D. Ford were writing the screenplay with Roth and Rendell after scribing the Roth-produced Clown (2014). In June 2016, Roth revealed on Reddit that the script still needed work in order for the film to live up to the trailer. In February 2019, reports indicated that Roth was slated to direct an undisclosed horror film for Miramax the next month in Boston, Massachusetts. Bloody Disgusting speculated that the film could potentially be Thanksgiving, but was unable to fully verify.

In January 2023, Deadline Hollywood reported that Spyglass Media Group was producing the film. Roth would depart from his Borderlands adaptation, passing additional photography off to Tim Miller, in order to direct the film.

Casting
In February 2023, Patrick Dempsey was cast in the film, while Addison Rae was cast in the lead role later that same month. Jalen Thomas Brooks, Nell Verlaque and Milo Manheim were cast in undisclosed roles.

Filming
Principal photography began in Toronto, Ontario on March 13 and is expected to wrap on April 21, 2023.

Release
In March 2023, TriStar Pictures acquired worldwide distribution rights.

References

External links
 

Upcoming films
Upcoming English-language films
2020s English-language films
Spyglass Entertainment films
TriStar Pictures films
Films directed by Eli Roth
Films with screenplays by Eli Roth
Films produced by Roger Birnbaum
American horror films
American slasher films